Narayan Goswami (born 9 September 1970) is an Indian politician from the state of West Bengal. He is newly elected member of the West Bengal Legislative Assembly, elected from the Ashoknagar (Vidhan Sabha constituency) in the 2021 West Bengal Legislative Assembly election.

Political party 
He is from the All India Trinamool Congress.

Constituency 
He represents the Ashoknagar (Vidhan Sabha constituency).

References 

1970 births
Living people
West Bengal MLAs 2021–2026
Trinamool Congress politicians from West Bengal
Bengali Hindus
Politicians from Kolkata
University of Calcutta alumni